The Baixedeiro is a small-sized horse breed that originated in the marshy regions of Brazil. Most of them are close to extinct and are currently under conservation in Brazil. They have a similar look to the Pantaneiro horse breed of Brazil but are smaller in size than this breed. They do best in wetlands most of the year, which is part of why they are undeveloped.

References 

Horse breeds
Horse breeds originating in Brazil